Oleksandr "Oles" Terentiyovych Honchar (3 April 1918 – 12 December 1995) was a Soviet and Ukrainian writer and public figure. He also was a veteran of World War II and member of the Ukrainian parliament.

Biography

Early years
However more recently found documents from the regional archives of Dnipropetrovsk Region tell that he was born in a village of Lomivka that just before World War II was incorporated into the city of Dnipropetrovsk. His mother died when he was three, while his father perished on a job site later in 1941. Being left parentless, he was taken by his maternal grandparents to live in the village of Sukhe. Living with his maternal grandparents, Oleksandr took their last name and, thus, became known as Oles Honchar (Oles is diminutive of Oleksandr).

Since 1925, Honchar studied first in his village (Sukhe) later in the village of Khorishky (today Kozelshchyna District). In 1933 he finished a seven-year school in the neighboring village of Breusivka. After finishing the school Honchar found a job with a local newspaper (Kozelshchyna District) "Expanded front". From 1933 to 1937 he studied journalism at the Kharkiv vocational school of Nikolai Ostrovsky (notorious for How the Steel Was Tempered). After the study Honchar worked as a teacher in a village of Manuilivka (today Derhachi District) near Kharkiv as well as a journalist in Kharkiv Region newspaper "Lenin's shift". In 1937 he started to publish his first works, mostly short stories, through various republican publishers: Literary newspaper, Pioneeria, Komsomolets of Ukraine, Young Bolshevik.

World War II and first recognition
In 1938, Honchar enrolled into the Department of Philology of Kharkiv University. During his study, he wrote such novellas as "Ivan Mostovy", "Cherries bloom", "Eaglet", a story "Stokozove field". On his third year at university his study was interrupted by World War II in June 1941 when he volunteered into the Red Army as part of a student battalion of the 72nd Guards Rifle Division. During the war, he was a staff sergeant and later the first sergeant of a mortar battery. Being wounded twice Honchar also earned numerous awards including the Soviet Order of Glory. During that time, he wrote poems (collection of poetry "Frontlines poems") that were published in 1985 as well as starting to work on his important future novel "Guide-on Bearers".

After the war, he resumed his studies in the Dnipropetrovsk University at the Department of Philology where he started to write the first part of his first major work, Guide-on Bearers "Alps". The novel was noticed by Yuri Yanovsky who being a chief editor of the magazine "Fatherland" at that time published it in 1946. He soon invited Honchar to Kyiv (Kiev) where Oles entered an aspirantura at the Shevchenko Institute of Literature of National Academy of Sciences of Ukraine. In Kyiv Honchar received an apartment (#65) in the specially designed Rolit building (68 Bohdan Khmelnytsky Street). Yanovsky becomes a kind of a mentor for the young writer who will extract a lot of creative lessons out of the communication with the maestro. Later in 1975 Honchar wrote a novel dedicating to him "Blue towers of Yanovsky". In 1947 Oles published a story "Earth is rumbling" about the underground movement of the Poltava Region as well as the second book of the novel "Guide-on Bearers" "Blue Danube". The novel which tells about the liberating mission of the Soviet Army in Europe was noticed by officials and critics. The young writer received the recognition (Stalin Prize (1948)) of authorities, critics, and, the most importantly, public.

Further career and literature accolades
In 1940s and 1950s, the writer continued to develop a war theme in his several novellas as well as publishing the last book of the Guide-on Bearers trilogy "Golden Prague". Along with his military themes, there started to sound a new one, a peaceful life of people and the moral aspects of their relationships. Novellas and novels in that direction ("Mykyta Bratus", 1950; "Let a light burn", 1955) prepare the future peaks of artistry for Honchar in 1960-70s. The historical-revolutionary dilogy of Honchar "Tavria" (1952) and "Perekop" (1957) commemorating to the events of the civil war in the Southern Ukraine is being left as the weakest anemic work. Around that time Honchar was starting his public and journalistic activities. He was conducting some traveling abroad which resulted in books of very short stories "Meeting with friends" (1950), "China up-close" (1951). For his literal work in 1959 Honchar was elected a chairman of the Union of Ukrainian Writers (1959–1971) and a secretary of the USSR Union of Writers.

In 1960, there was published the novel "Person and weapon" which opened a new page in the artistry of Oles Honchar. The romantic-philosophical direction of the piece, the emphasis on intimate matters of life and death of a person, problems of indestructibility of morality of human spirit distinguish the novel that is based on the writer's recollections about the student volunteer battalion during the war times. The novel was awarded the newly created Shevchenko Prize in 1962. The second part of the dilogy, the novel "Cyclone" (1970) was written after a break. The theme received a sudden continuation where the aged hero from "Person and weapon" becomes a film director and shoots a movie about war. Intertwining of reality and staged scenes of present and recollections about the past as well as the very subject of cinematography reminds of Yanovsky's "Master of ship".

The novel of short stories "Tronka" (1963) was the first major work of Honchar commemorating to a contemporary peaceful life. Constructed in the form of an original "wreath of novellas" revealing different aspects of life of ordinary people, residents of the Ukrainian steppes, the novel paints a complete panorama of characters, images, situations. In "Tronka" for the first time in the Ukrainian literature was acutely posed the problem of Stalinism eradication, the struggle of old with new. On the wave of the Khrushchev thaw the novel was awarded the Lenin Prize in 1964.

Cathedral and later career
A sad fate was destined for the next Honchar's novel The Cathedral, 1968. In comparison with "Tronka" the novel is much more closer to the traditional realism with broadly distinct positive and negative characters. The struggle for the revival of spirituality, for the historical memory of people as the foundation of decency in relationships between people is situated in the epicenter of story. The prototype of the cathedral in the novel served the Novomoskovsk Holy-Trinity Cathedral (Dnipropetrovsk Region). The Dnipropetrovsk Region Communist Party leader Oleksiy Vatchenko recognized himself in the image of a negative character the soulless party member opportunist who deposited his father in a retirement home. Being a friend of Leonid Brezhnev, Vatchenko requested a ban on the novel. The novel was published only in magazines, while the already printed copies of the book were confiscated and the translation to the Russian language was suspended. Despite the attempts to protect the piece (articles of Mykola Bazhan and others) it was prohibited and the mentioning about it has ceased. The only thing that saved Honchar from further prosecutions was his position in the Writer's Union.

In works of his later period, Honchar continued to raise the contemporary morale-ethical subject (novel "Your dawn", 1980), a subject of young searches romance (story "Brigantina", 1973). In 1980, he released the book "Writer's reflections" where he has summarized his artistic work. From 1962 to 1990 Honchar was a People's Deputy in the Supreme Council of the Soviet Union. In 1978 he was awarded the title of Academician and the membership at the Ukrainian Academy of Sciences. With the fall of the Soviet Union, Honchar was one of the creators of the Society of Ukrainian Language and the People's Movement of Ukraine. In 1990 he quit the Communist Party of Soviet Union during the Revolution on Granite. In 1991, Honchar released a new book "By that we live. On the path of Ukrainian revival". In 1992, the University of Alberta recognized him as the honorary doctor.

He also to be known as one who urged the president of Ukraine to rebuild the St Michael's Golden-Domed Cathedral in Kyiv, which was destroyed by the Soviet authorities.

Oles Honchar was buried at Baikove Cemetery in Kyiv.

Awards and prizes

Civil
 Stalin Prize (1948), for the first two books of the novel "Guide-on Bearers" (1946–47)
 Stalin Prize (1949), for the third book of the novel "Guide-on Bearers" (1948)
 Order of Lenin (3 awards in 1960, 1967, 1978)
National Shevchenko Prize (1962), for novel "Person and weapon" (1960)
 Lenin Prize (1964), for novel "Tronka" (1963)
 Order of the October Revolution (1971)
Hero of Socialist Labor (31 March 1978), for great achievements in development of Soviet literature, productive public work, and in regard to the sixtieth birthday of the writer Oles Honchar by the order of the Presidium of the Supreme Council of the Soviet Union (Order of Lenin and medal of Sickle and Mallet)
 USSR State Prize (1982), for novel "Your dawn" (1980)
Order of Friendship of Peoples (1982)
 Order of the Red Banner of Labour (1984, 1988)
Hero of Ukraine (2005), posthumously

Medal "Veteran of Labour"
Medal "In Commemoration of the 1500th Anniversary of Kyiv"
 Alexander Fadeyev Gold Medal
 S. Nejman Prize (Czech Republic)
Military
 Order of Red Star (1945)
 Order of Glory, III degree (1945)
Order of the Patriotic War, I degree (1985)
 Medal For Courage (3 medals in 1944 and 1945)
 Medal "For the Capture of Berlin"
Jubilee Medal "In Commemoration of the 100th Anniversary of the Birth of Vladimir Ilyich Lenin"
Medal "For the Victory over Germany in the Great Patriotic War 1941–1945"
Medal "Twenty Years of Victory in the Great Patriotic War 1941–1945"
Medal "Thirty Years of Victory in the Great Patriotic War 1941–1945"
Medal "Forty Years of Victory in the Great Patriotic War 1941–1945"
Medal "50 Years of Victory in the Great Patriotic War 1941–1945"
Medal "50 Years of the Armed Forces of the USSR"
Medal "60 Years of the Armed Forces of the USSR"
Jubilee Medal "70 Years of the Armed Forces of the USSR"

Major works
 , about the Great Patriotic War; two Stalin Prizes
 The Cathedral

References

External links

 Biography and overview of his diary 
 Ukrainian coins commemorating the writer 
 Review of the Sobor through the political prizm before its publishment  

1918 births
1995 deaths
20th-century male writers
20th-century short story writers
Writers from Dnipro
People from Yekaterinoslav Governorate
Heroes of Socialist Labour
Stalin Prize winners
Lenin Prize winners
Recipients of the Medal "For Courage" (Russia)
Recipients of the Order of Friendship of Peoples
Recipients of the Order of Glory
Recipients of the Order of Lenin
Recipients of the Order of the Red Banner of Labour
Recipients of the Order of the Red Star
Recipients of the Shevchenko National Prize
Recipients of the title of Hero of Ukraine
Recipients of the USSR State Prize
Central Committee of the Communist Party of the Soviet Union candidate members
Sixth convocation members of the Soviet of Nationalities
Seventh convocation members of the Soviet of Nationalities
Eighth convocation members of the Soviet of Nationalities
Ninth convocation members of the Soviet of Nationalities
Tenth convocation members of the Soviet of Nationalities
Eleventh convocation members of the Soviet of Nationalities
Members of the Congress of People's Deputies of the Soviet Union
First convocation members of the Verkhovna Rada
Members of the National Academy of Sciences of Ukraine
Ukrainian male short story writers
Ukrainian short story writers
Soviet short story writers
Soviet novelists
Ukrainian novelists
Soviet journalists
Male journalists
Soviet male poets
Ukrainian male poets
Socialist realism writers
Ukrainian people of World War II
National University of Kharkiv alumni
Oles Honchar Dnipro National University alumni
Soviet military personnel of World War II from Ukraine
Politicians from Dnipro
Burials at Baikove Cemetery
Ukrainian anti-fascists